Jurgen Vrapi (born 14 November 1998) is an Albanian professional footballer who plays as a midfielder for Albanian club Tirana  and the Albania national under-21 team.

Club career

Early career
Vrapi started his youth career at age of 13 at KF Tirana Reserves and Academy in 2011. In the 2016–17 season he played for the under-19 side 11 matches and made 3 appearances for KF Tirana B in the 2016–17 Albanian Second Division. In February 2017 he moved abroad at Croatian side Lokomotiva Zagreb.

Tirana

Dinamo Tirana
On 29 August 2018, fellow capital club Dinamo Tirana signed Vrapi on a one-year contract.

International career
Vrapi received his first call up to the Albania national under-19 team by coach Altin Lala for the friendly tournament Roma Caput Mundi in Rome, Italy between 8–13 March 2015 against Malta U-19, Wales U-19 and Italy U-19. He was called up again to the Albania under-19 almost 1 year later by coach Arjan Bellaj for the next friendly tournament Roma Caput Mundi from 29 February–4 March 2016.

Career statistics

Club

References

Honours
Tirana
 Albanian First Division: 2017–18

External links
Soccerway profile

1998 births
Living people
Footballers from Tirana
Albanian footballers
Association football midfielders
Albania youth international footballers
Albania under-21 international footballers
KF Tirana players
FK Dinamo Tirana players
Flamurtari Vlorë players
Kategoria e Dytë players
Kategoria e Parë players
Albanian expatriate footballers
Albanian expatriate sportspeople in Croatia
Expatriate footballers in Croatia